Federal Highway 295 (La Carretera Federal 295) (Fed. 295) is a toll-free part of the federal highway corridors  (los corredores carreteros federales) of Mexico.

References

295